Mount Ekblaw is a mountain,  high, standing  east of Mount Van Valkenburg in the eastern part of the Clark Mountains in Marie Byrd Land. It was discovered on aerial flights from the West Base of the United States Antarctic Service in 1940 and named for W.E. Ekblaw, professor of geography at Clark University and a member of the Crocker Land Expedition in the Arctic (1913–17).

References 

Mountains of Marie Byrd Land